William Martinez of Martínez may refer to:
William Martinez (actor) (born 1966), Filipino actor
William Martínez (footballer) (1928–1997), Uruguayan footballer
Will Martinez (born 1980), American mixed martial artist
William J. Martínez (born 1954), American federal judge

See also
Williams Martínez (born 1982), Uruguayan footballer
Willie Martinez (disambiguation)